Georg Lhotzky (6 February 1937 – 28 November 2016) was an Austrian actor and film director. He directed 15 films between 1960 and 1991.

Selected filmography
 Moss on the Stones (1968)
 I Want to Live (1976)

References

External links

1937 births
2016 deaths
Austrian male film actors
Austrian film directors
Austrian television directors
Austrian people of Czech descent
German-language film directors
People from Opava